Biagui Kamissoko (born February 9, 1983) is a retired French professional footballer.

External links
 Profile at L'Équipe

1983 births
Living people
French people of Malian descent
Footballers from Paris
Association football midfielders
French footballers
Ligue 1 players
Ligue 2 players
Grenoble Foot 38 players
Stade de Reims players
Vannes OC players
ÉFC Fréjus Saint-Raphaël players
Championnat National players